The Jain temple of Antwerp is located in the municipality Wilrijk.

History 
The building has a surface area of 1,000 m2 and has been in use since 2010. Construction started in 1990 in India. After it was completed in 2000, the building was dismantled piece by piece, shipped to Belgium and rebuild on its current location. The white marble design is inspired by traditional Jain Temples.

About temple 
It is the biggest Jain temple outside of India. The temple houses an information centre about Jainism.

See also 
 Jainism in Belgium

References

Citations

Sources 
 
  Chris De Lauwer, "Een Indiase tempel in België", in: Idesbald Goddeeris (red.), Het wiel van Ashoka. Belgisch-Indiase contacten in historisch perspectief, 2013, p. 233-240

External links

Religious buildings and structures in Antwerp
2010 establishments in Belgium
Religious buildings and structures completed in 2010
21st-century Jain temples
Jain temples in Belgium